The 2011–12 Cornwall Hockey Association Plate was 2011–12 season of the Cornwall Hockey Association Plate known as the Cornwall Plate or CHA Plate.  The Plate is the secondary knock-out competition organised by the Cornwall Hockey Association and was be contested by senior male and female hockey teams in the county of Cornwall who had been eliminated from the 2011–12 Cornwall Hockey Association Cup in (or prior to) Round 1.

Eighteen teams had competed in the competition (a reduction of one compared to the 2010–11 competition) and began Sunday 18 December 2011 with the Ladies' Plate Round 1. The competition  culminated with the Ladies' Plate Final on Sunday 15 April 2012 at Penzance HC. St. Austell HC (1st XI) and Truro HC (1st XI) are the respective holders of the Men's and Ladies' Plates.

Format 
The Men's Plate and Ladies' Plate  were contested as knockout competitions, with a single defeat eliminating the losing team.

For 2011–12, the draws for all rounds of the competitions were made prior to the start of the tournament, thereby allowing teams to analyse their potential opponents in any subsequent rounds.  This system was previously used in the 2009–10 season, but dropped for the 2010–11 competition in favour of a system for drawing each round following the completion of the previous one.  As the trial proved unsuccessful, the system reverted for 2011–12.

Teams and calendar

Men's Plate

Based upon the results of the six matches contested in Round 1 of the 2011-12 CHA Cup the following six teams qualified for the Plate competition:

The draw for the competition will be based upon the draw for the 2011-12 CHA Cup.

Ladies' Plate

Based upon the results of the three Preliminary round matches, and eight matches contested in Round 1 of the 2011-12 CHA Cup the following eleven teams qualified for the Plate competition:

Of the eleven competing teams, the highest ranked four teams, plus one further team drawn at random will be given a bye to the quarter finals, with the remaining six teams drawn randomly into Round 1.

Results and fixtures
The draw for the Men's Plate and Ladies' Plate was carried out on 1 December 2011.

Men's Plate

Quarter-finals

Semi-finals

Final

Ladies' Plate

References

External links 
 http://www.cornwallhockey.org/default.aspx?id=4

Cornwall Hockey Association Plate